The wXw Shotgun Championship is a professional wrestling championship created and promoted by the German promotion Westside Xtreme Wrestling. All title matches are broadcast on YouTube. The first champion was crowned on August 18, 2013. Ilja Dragunov defeated Tony Blunt in the finals of a tournament to become the first champion. There have been a total of 35 reigns and four vacancies shared between 27 different champions. The current champion is Laurance Roman who is in his first reign.

Title history

Combined reigns 

See also
wXw Unified World Wrestling Championship
wXw World Tag Team Championship

References

External links
wXw Shotgun Championship

Westside Xtreme Wrestling championships
Television wrestling championships